James Holdsworth (July 14, 1850 – March 22, 1918), nicknamed "Long Jim", was a professional baseball player who played shortstop in Major League Baseball for seven different teams during his nine-season career from  to . Holdsworth died in his hometown of New York City, and is interred at Woodlawn Cemetery. He played in the National Association, National League, and briefly the American Association.

In 1877, the Brooklyn Eagle described Holdsworth as "a good honest player, an excellent bat and a fine outfielder." Holdsworth went through an elaborate wind-up in preparation to hit pitches, such that the press dubbed him "the dancing batter."

Holdsworth carries the distinction of the lowest walk rate in history; he walked just 8 times in 1,489 plate appearances. (A walk was not earned with four balls until 1889, for several years in the 1870s taking as many as nine.)

In 1885, he played for the Rochester Flour Cities of the New York State League.

After his retirement, he continued to play in old-timers' games.

References

External links

Major League Baseball shortstops
Morrisania Unions players
Cleveland Forest Citys players
Brooklyn Eckfords players
New York Mutuals players
Philadelphia White Stockings players
Hartford Dark Blues players
Troy Trojans players
Indianapolis Hoosiers (NL) players
Baseball players from New York (state)
Burials at Woodlawn Cemetery (Bronx, New York)
19th-century baseball players
1850 births
1918 deaths
Pittsburgh Allegheny players
New Bedford (minor league baseball) players
New Haven (minor league baseball) players
Hartford (minor league baseball) players
Brooklyn Atlantics (minor league) players
Trenton (minor league baseball) players
Rochester Flour Cities players